Efforts to save endangered species may, paradoxically, lead to conservation-induced extinction of other species. This mostly threatens the parasite and pathogen species that are highly host-specific to critically endangered hosts. When the last individuals of a host species are captured for the purpose of captive breeding and reintroduction programs, they typically undergo anti-parasitic treatments to increase survival and reproductive success. This practice may unintentionally result in the extinction of the species antagonistic to the target species, such as certain parasites. It has been proposed that the parasites should be reintroduced to the endangered population. A few cases of conservation-induced extinction have occurred in parasitic lice.

Examples

 Parasite: Colpocephalum californici – host: California condorThe parasite most probably became extinct when the last individuals of its only host species were captured for a captive-breeding program; all parasites found were deliberately killed in an attempt to assist the host's survival.
 Parasite: Rallicola pilgrimi – host: little spotted kiwiThe parasite most probably became extinct when the last individuals of its only host species were captured and, after routine veterinary antiparasitic treatments, re-introduced into predator-free islands.
 Parasite: Rallicola guami – host: Guam railThe only known host species of this parasite exists exclusively in captivity and kept under veterinary control. No information about the fate of the parasite, likely extinct.
 Parasite: Linognathus petasmatus – host: scimitar-horned oryxThe host specificity of this parasite is uncertain. Either it was specific to the scimitar-horned oryx and became extinct during captive breeding of the host, or – alternatively – it may be specific to the addax and possibly still surviving in the wild.
Parasite: Felicola isidoroi – host: Iberian lynx.As with Colpocephalum californici, likely became extinct when the last individuals of its host species were taken into captivity and deloused.

Erroneous example

 The trichodectid louse of the black-footed ferret has been mentioned in the literature several times as a parasite that became extinct during the captive breeding program of the host. However, this parasite most probably never existed as a separate species from Neotrichodectes minutus.

See also

Cobra effect, the general phenomenon of a solution to a problem making the problem worse
Conservation biology of parasites

References

External links
The Iberian lynx and its unique louse

Conservation biology
Extinction
Neologisms